Antrim County is a county located in the U.S. state of Michigan. As of the 2020 Census, the population was 23,431. The county seat is Bellaire. The name is taken from County Antrim in Northern Ireland.

Antrim County is home to Torch Lake, Michigan's deepest and second-largest inland lake. Torch Lake, famous for its clear and blue waters, is part of the Chain of Lakes Watershed, most of which lies within Antrim County. The county is bordered to the west by Grand Traverse Bay, a bay of Lake Michigan.

History

Meegisee County was separated from Michilimackinac County as an unorganized county in 1840. It took its name from a Chippewa chief who signed the 1821 Treaty of Chicago and the 1826 Treaty of Mississinewas. Meegisee also derives from the Ojibwe , meaning bald eagle. The county was renamed Antrim County in 1843, one of the Irish names given to five renamed Michigan counties at that time, supposedly in deference to the increasing number of settlers of Irish heritage in Michigan at that time. In the text of the 1843 legislative act, the name was misspelled as "Antim". In 1851, for governmental purposes, Antrim County was attached to Grand Traverse County.

Separate county government was organized in 1863. The county seat was originally located in Elk Rapids, but was moved to Bellaire in 1904 after 25 years of litigation. In 1950 its population was 10,721.

YMCA Camp Hayo-Went-Ha, the oldest American summer camp that sits on its original site, was opened on the shore of Torch Lake in Central Lake Township in 1904.

Antrim County was in national headlines during the 2020 presidential election, as election night results showed the reliably Republican county voting heavily Democratic, which was later proven to be human error. This incident has been cited by multiple conspiracy theorists.

Geography

Antrim County is flanked to the west by Grand Traverse Bay, a bay of Lake Michigan. Most of the bodies of water within the Chain of Lakes, including Torch Lake, are within Antrim County.

Lakes 

 Lake Arthur
 Bass Lake
 Bates Lake
 Beals Lake
 Lake Bellaire
 Benway Lake
 Birch Lake
 Boat Lake
 Browning Lake
 Carpenter Lake
 Clam Lake
 Eaton Lake
 Elk Lake
 Ellsworth Lake
 Finn Lake
 Grass Lake
 Green Lake
 Hanley Lake
 Harwood Lake
 Hawk Lake
 Henry Lake
 Intermediate Lake
 Lake of the Woods
 Lime Lake
 Little Torch Lake
 Lyman Lake
 Maplehurst Lake
 Moblo Lake
 Mud Lake
 Scotts Lake
 Six Mile Lake
 Lake Skegemog
 Skinner Lake
 Smith Lake
 St. Clair Lake
 Thayer Lake
 Toad Lake
 Torch Lake
 Wetzel Lake
 Wilson Lake

Rivers 

 Boyne River
 Cedar River
 Dingman River
 Elk River
 Grass River
 Green River
 Intermediate River
 Jordan River
 Manistee River
 Torch River

Adjacent counties 
By land

 Charlevoix County (north)
 Otsego County (east)
 Crawford County (southeast)
 Kalkaska County (south)
 Grand Traverse County (southwest)

By water

 Leelanau County (west)

Transportation

State-maintained highways

  is a north–south highway that runs along the shore of Grand Traverse Bay in western Antrim County, passing through the communities of Elk Rapids, Torch Lake, Eastport, and Atwood. South of Antrim County, US 31 enters Traverse City, and continues further south along the Lake Michigan, passing cities such as Manistee, Ludington, Muskegon, Grand Haven, Holland, and Benton Harbor. North of Antrim County, US 31 passes through Charlevoix and Petoskey before terminating at Interstate 75 south of Mackinaw City.
  in Antrim County follows a largely southwest–northeast route in the pastoral east of the county, passing through the communities of Mancelona and Alba. Following a north–south route further inland than US 31, the highway passes through cities to the south such as Kalamazoo, Grand Rapids and Cadillac. North of Antrim County, the highway terminates at US 31 in Petoskey.
  is an east–west highway in northeastern Antrim County. The highway begins at East Jordan, just north of the Antrim County line, and continues east toward Elmira, Gaylord, Atlanta, Hillman, and Alpena. In Antrim County, M-32 shares a brief concurrency with US 131.
  is a north–south highway that runs through central Antrim County. The highway enters from the south via a concurrency with US 131. At Mancelona, M-66 takes on an independent route, running north to East Jordan before terminating at US 31 at Charlevoix. South of Antrim County, M-66 runs through communities such as Sturgis, Battle Creek, Ionia, Lake City, and Kalkaska.
  is an s-shaped highway, signed as an east–west route, that runs entirely within Antrim County. The highway serves to connect Antrim County's interior villages, Bellaire and Central Lake, with US 31 at Eastport and US 131/M-66 at Mancelona.

County-designated highways 

  serves as an easterly extension of M-88. The highway begins at US 131/M-66 in Mancelona, and continues east to Otsego County.
  serves as a cutoff between US 131 at Alba and M-32 west of Gaylord in Otsego County.
  is an east–west route in northwest Antrim County, connecting US 31 near Atwood to the village of Ellsworth and M-66 at East Jordan.
  is a north–south route in northern Antrim County, connecting Ellsworth to US 31 in Charlevoix County.
  is a short route in northeastern Antrim County, serving as a direct route between M-32 and M-75 near Boyne City.

Airports
 Antrim County Airport - county-owned public-use airport, northeast of Bellaire, for general aviation. One paved runway. No airline service.

Demographics

As of the 2010 United States Census, there were 23,580 people, 9,890 households, and 6,925 families in the county. The population density was 49 people per square mile (19/km2).  There were 17,824 housing units at an average density of 37 per square mile (45/km2). 96.8% of the population were White, 1.0% Native American, 0.2% Asian, 0.2% Black or African American, 0.4% of some other race and 1.4% of two or more races.  1.7% were Hispanic or Latino (of any race). 20.2% were of German, 13.4% English, 8.9% Irish, 6.9% French, French Canadian or Cajun, 6.9% Polish and 6.4% American ancestry.

There were 9,222 households, out of which 26% had children under the age of 18 living with them, 57.30% were married couples living together, 8.30% had a female householder with no husband present, and 30% were non-families. 25.3% of all households were made up of individuals, and 11.50% had someone living alone who was 65 years of age or older. The average household size was 2.36 and the average family size was 2.78.

The county population contained 21.10% under the age of 18, 6.30% from 19 to 24, 3.9% from 25 to 44, 31.1% from 45 to 64, and 22.2% who were 65 years of age or older. The median age was 47 years. For every 100 females there were 99.80 males.

Government
Antrim County has been reliably Republican since its organization. Since 1884 its voters have selected the Republican Party nominee in 94% (33 of 35) of the national elections through 2020.

Antrim County operates the County jail, maintains rural roads, operates the major local courts, records deeds, mortgages, and vital records, administers public health regulations, and participates with the state in the provision of social services. The county board of commissioners controls the budget and has limited authority to make laws or ordinances. In Michigan, most local government functions – police and fire, building and zoning, tax assessment, street maintenance etc. – are the responsibility of individual cities and townships.

Elected officials

 Prosecuting Attorney: James Rossiter
 Sheriff: Daniel S. Bean
 County Clerk: Sheryl Guy
 County Treasurer: Sherry A. Comben
 Register of Deeds: Patty Niepoth
 Drain Commissioner: Mark Stone
 County Surveyor: Scott Papineau

(information as of September 2018)

Communities

Villages
 Bellaire (county seat)
 Central Lake
 Elk Rapids
 Ellsworth
 Mancelona

Civil townships

 Banks Township
 Central Lake Township
 Chestonia Township
 Custer Township
 Echo Township
 Elk Rapids Township
 Forest Home Township
 Helena Township
 Jordan Township
 Kearney Township
 Mancelona Township
 Milton Township
 Star Township
 Torch Lake Township
 Warner Township

Census-designated places
 Alba
 Alden
 Eastport
 Lakes of the North

Unincorporated communities

 Antrim
 Atwood
 Elmira
 Clam River
 Kewadin
 Pleasant Valley
 Torch Lake
 Torch River

Ghost towns 

 Antrim City
 Chestonia
 Comfort
 Creswell
 Elgin
 Essex
 Green River
 Wetzel

Indian reservations 
 Grand Traverse Indian Reservation, which has territories in five counties, occupies two small sections within Helena Township and one section in Milton Township.

Education
School districts include:
 Alba Public Schools
 Bellaire Public Schools
 Boyne City Public Schools
 Boyne Falls Public School District
 Central Lake Public Schools
 Charlevoix Public Schools
 East Jordan Public Schools
 Elk Rapids Schools
 Ellsworth Community Schools
 Gaylord Community Schools
 Mancelona Public Schools

See also
 List of Michigan State Historic Sites in Antrim County, Michigan
 National Register of Historic Places listings in Antrim County, Michigan

References

External links
 Antrim County Website
 Antrim County Online News Website and Event List

 
Michigan counties
Populated places established in 1863
1863 establishments in Michigan